Pierre Aubenque (23 July 1929 – 23 February 2020) was a French philosopher. He was strongly focused on Aristotle.

Biography
Aubenque was a student at the École normale supérieure in Paris and earned his Agrégation in philosophy in 1950. He became an assistant professor at the University of Montpellier, then a professor at the University of Franche-Comté and Aix-Marseille University. In 1969, he began teaching philosophy at Sorbonne University. He also wrote many works published by Éditions Beauchesne.

Works
Le problème de l'être chez Aristote (1962)
La prudence chez Aristote (1963)
Sénèque (1964)
La prudence chez Kant (1975)
Histoire de la philosophie (1979)
Concepts et catégories dans la pensée antique (1980)
Aristote et les choses humaines (1998)
Dictionnaire des philosophes (1998)
Faut-il déconstruire la métaphysique ? (2009)
Problèmes aristotéliciens. Philosophie théorique (2009)
Problèmes aristotéliciens. Philosophie pratique (2011)

References

1929 births
2020 deaths
École Normale Supérieure alumni
Academic staff of the University of Montpellier
Academic staff of the University of Franche-Comté
Academic staff of Aix-Marseille University
Academic staff of the University of Paris